Hendrik Adriaan (Hein) van Beuningen (18 June 1841, Rossum – 7 February 1908, Utrecht) was a Dutch businessman and politician.

Van Beuningen was the son of Willem van Beuningen, a Protestant pastor and Adriana Maria Boonen. In 1858 he started working as a clerk at the Dutch Rhenish Railway. However he was promoted within a few years and soon became their freight transport manager.

Van Beuningen became politically active in 1878; first as a municipal councillor in Utrecht, and later as a member of the States of Utrecht. He continued to play these two roles  until his death in 1908.

References

1841 births
1908 deaths
19th-century Dutch businesspeople
Dutch corporate directors
Members of the House of Representatives (Netherlands)
Knights of the Order of the Netherlands Lion
Officers of the Order of Orange-Nassau
People from Maasdriel